Christian Carolina Jaramillo Quintero (born 19 March 1994) is a Mexican professional football midfielder who plays for Guadalajara of the Liga MX Femenil.

She played for the Mexico national team in a 2017 friendly against Costa Rica.

International goals

Honours

Club
UANL
Liga MX Femenil: Clausura 2018
Liga MX Femenil: Clausura 2019
Liga MX Femenil: Clausura 2022

References

External links 
 

1994 births
Living people
Mexican women's footballers
Footballers from Baja California
Mexican footballers
Sportspeople from Tijuana
Liga MX Femenil players
Tigres UANL (women) footballers
Mexico women's international footballers
Women's association football midfielders
20th-century Mexican women
21st-century Mexican women